Vasily Nikolayevich Panov (November 1, 1906 – January 13, 1973) was a Soviet chess player, author, and journalist.  Winner of the Moscow City Championship in 1929, he also played in five USSR Chess Championships from 1935 to 1948.  His greatest tournament victory was Kiev, 1938.  He was awarded the International Master title by FIDE in 1950. The website Chessmetrics.com, which assigns retroactive ratings to older players, ranks Panov as 21st in the world in 1948. This ranking is higher than many Grandmasters.
Panov is best known for his chess writings and theoretical work on the openings.  He was chess correspondent for Izvestia from 1942 to 1965.  His many books include a beginners' guide, biographies of Alekhine and Capablanca, and Kurs debyutov (1957), Russia's best-selling book on the chess opening.

Contribution to openings

Panov contributed greatly to the theory of the Caro–Kann Defence and the Ruy Lopez.  A variation of the Caro-Kann starting with the moves 1.e4 c6 2.d4 d5 3.exd5 cxd5 4.c4 is known as the Panov Attack (sometimes Panov–Botvinnik Attack). He is also credited with a sound variation of Alekhine's Defence for White, 1.e4 Nf6 2.e5 Nd5 3.d4 d6 4.Nf3 Bg4 5.h3, known as the Panov Variation.

Books
 Comprehensive Chess Openings, by Yakov Estrin and Vasily Panov, in three volumes, Pergamon, 1980.   (for set of three volumes in flexicover)

References

Further reading
 V. Panov, Sorok let za shakmatnoi doskoi (1966), an autobiography with 50 games
 Ya. B. Estrin, Vasily Panov (1986), 80 games

1906 births
1973 deaths
Russian chess players
Soviet chess players
Russian chess writers
Soviet chess writers
Soviet male writers
20th-century Russian male writers
Chess International Masters
Chess theoreticians
20th-century chess players